Skelton is a hamlet in the East Riding of Yorkshire, England, and a linear settlement on the east bank of the River Ouse. It forms part of the civil parish of Kilpin. Skelton lies within the constituency of Haltemprice and Howden, an area placed as the 10th most affluent in the country in a Barclays Private Clients survey.

See also
Goole railway swing bridge, also known as the Skelton viaduct

References
Notes

Sources

External links

Hamlets in the East Riding of Yorkshire